Events from the year 2017 in the Czech Republic

Incumbents
 President – Miloš Zeman
 Prime Minister – Bohuslav Sobotka

Events

27 January – A Czech court rules in favour of a nursing school that banned a Somali refugee student from wearing a headscarf.
6 February – A Prague Fast-Food Restaurant Bans the Burka.
19 September – A Czech appeals court upholds a lower court ruling that went against the headscarf.

In popular culture

Sports
25–29 January – The 2017 European Figure Skating Championships were hosted by the Czech Figure Skating Association.
2–14 May – The 2017 UEFA Women's Under-17 Championship was hosted in the cities of Plzeň and Příbram, and the towns of Přeštice and Domažlice.
16–25 June – The EuroBasket Women 2017 was hosted in the Czech cities of Prague and Hradec Králové.

Television
2 January – First episode of the television series Svět pod hlavou was aired (first of ten episodes).

Deaths

16 January – Jiří Navrátil, scout leader (b. 1923).
20 January – Naděžda Kavalírová, physician and human rights activist (b. 1923).
23 January – Jaroslav Vacek, Indologist (b. 1943).
27 January – Petr Kop, volleyball player and Olympian (b. 1937).
28 January – Lubomír Doležel, literary theorist (b. 1922).
7 February – Antonín Přidal, writer and translator (b. 1935).
11 February – Jarmila Šuláková, folk singer and actress (b. 1929).
14 February – Jiří Lanský, high jumper and Olympian (b. 1933).
16 February – Josef Augusta, ice hockey player and coach (b. 1946).
23 February – Ivo Svoboda, politician (b. 1948).
18 March – Miloslav Vlk, cardinal and Archbishop of Prague (b. 1932).
22 March – 
 Alexandr Kliment, writer (b. 1929). 
 Helena Štáchová, puppeteer (b. 1944).
26 March – Věra Špinarová, singer (b. 1951).
6 April – Libuše Havelková, actress (b. 1924).
18 April – Augustin Bubník, ice hockey player and Olympian (b. 1928).
23 April – František Rajtoral, footballer (b. 1986).
24 April –
 František Brůna, handball player (b. 1944).
 Dagmar Lerchová, figure skater and Olympian (b. 1930).
19 May – David Bystroň, footballer (b. 1982).
31 May – Jiří Bělohlávek, conductor (b. 1946).
2 June – Jaroslav Kořán, Mayor of Prague, translator (b. 1940).
15 June – Olbram Zoubek, sculptor (b. 1926).
25 June – Eduard Zeman, politician (b. 1948).
16 July – Eva Děpoltová, operatic soprano (b. 1945).
19 July – Karel Franta, painter (b. 1928).
22 July – František Ševčík, ice hockey player and Olympian (b. 1942).
25 July – Ivana Loudová, composer (b. 1941).
19 November – Jana Novotná, tennis player, (b. 1968).
2 December – Iva Ritschelová, economist, (b. 1964)

References

 
Years of the 21st century in the Czech Republic
Czech Republic
Czech Republic
2010s in the Czech Republic